Anatoly Gennadyevich Aksakov (born 28 November 1957 in Yermolayevo) is a Russian politician and economist. He is a member of the Russian State Duma from the A Just Russia party.

Early life and career 
After graduating from secondary school in 1975, Aksakov began studies at Moscow State University in the Economics Department in 1977. After graduating in 1983 as a qualified economist, Aksakov served as a Deputy in the State Council of the Chuvash Republic. In 1986 he completed post-graduate studies in economics at Moscow State University.

From 1986 Aksakov was a lecturer at Chuvash State University as a docent in Economic Theory and Market Economics, and from 19941997 he was Deputy Director of the Institute of Economics, Finance and Law in Cheboksary, whilst also holding the position of Director of the Cheboksary branches of the Moscow Commercial Bank from 19951997.

Political career 
From 19972000, Aksakov was Deputy Chairman of the Cabinet and Minister of Economic Affairs of the Chuvash Republic.

In the 1999 State Duma elections, he was elected as a Deputy in the State Duma of the Russian Federation for the Cheboksary constituency, and became Deputy Chairman of the Committee on Economic Policy and Entrepreneurship. In the 2005 State Duma elections, Aksakov was re-elected for the same district as a member of United Russia.

In 2005, Aksakov graduated from the Diplomatic Academy of the Ministry of Foreign Affairs of the Russian Federation as a specialist in the field of international relations.

In the 2007 State Duma elections, he was re-elected as a member of the federal list of A Just Russia.

Aksakov is a member of the National Banking Council of Central Bank of Russia and is a member of the board of the Russian Union of Industrialists and Entrepreneurs.

References

External links
  Anatoly Aksakov official website
  Anatoly Aksakov profile at the State Duma website
  Profile at A Just Russia website

1957 births
Living people
People from Kuyurgazinsky District
United Russia politicians
A Just Russia politicians
People's Party of the Russian Federation politicians
Moscow State University alumni
Diplomatic Academy of the Ministry of Foreign Affairs of the Russian Federation alumni
21st-century Russian politicians
Third convocation members of the State Duma (Russian Federation)
Fourth convocation members of the State Duma (Russian Federation)
Fifth convocation members of the State Duma (Russian Federation)
Sixth convocation members of the State Duma (Russian Federation)
Seventh convocation members of the State Duma (Russian Federation)
Eighth convocation members of the State Duma (Russian Federation)